The David Bowie Isolar – 1976 Tour was a concert tour in support of the album Station to Station. It opened on 2 February 1976 at the Pacific Coliseum, Vancouver, and continued through North America and Europe, concluding at the Pavillon de Paris in Paris, France, on 18 May 1976. The tour is commonly referred to as Thin White Duke Tour, The Station to Station Tour, and The White Light Tour.

History

The performances began without introduction with a showing of the 1928 surrealist film by Luis Buñuel and Salvador Dalí, Un Chien Andalou, which includes a famous section of a razor blade cutting into a woman's eyeball. Bowie appeared on stage immediately as the film finished, while the audience was still disoriented. The visual element of the performances incorporated banks of fluorescent white light set against black backdrops creating a stark spectacle on a stage largely devoid of props or other visual distractions.

The Public Auditorium, Cleveland, Ohio performance on 28 February 1976 was recorded by a concert-goer and released as the bootleg entitled NeoExpressionism on the TSP (The Swingin' Pig) label. It would be digitally re-mastered in 2007 and the entire set released on 2 CDs. The only song not done at this performance is "Sister Midnight."

The Nassau Veterans Memorial Coliseum, Uniondale, New York, performance on 23 March 1976 was recorded by RCA Records with extracts broadcast by The King Biscuit Radio Network. Two songs from the performance were later included on the 1991 Rykodisc re-issue of the Station to Station album. The entire Nassau performance is available on the 2010 deluxe edition of Station to Station as well as the 2016 box set Who Can I Be Now? (1974–1976). It was released separately on LP, CD and digitally in February 2017 as Live Nassau Coliseum '76.

Tour keyboardist Tony Kaye has soundboard recordings of the 26 March 1976 Madison Square Gardens and 17-18 May Pavillion de Paris shows, and has expressed hope that they might eventually be released.

Bowie took friend and fellow musician Iggy Pop along as his companion on the tour. Following a March 21, 1976 show, Bowie and Pop were arrested together for marijuana possession in Rochester, New York, although charges were later dropped.

Title
The tour has been described under numerous different names. Although officially referred to as the Isolar tour, it has also been given the names the Thin White Duke tour, the Station to Station tour, and the White Light Tour. According to biographer Nicholas Pegg, the word "Isolar" is an anagram of "sailor", one of Bowie's favourite words. Isolar also derives from the company Bowie launched to handle music publishing after his acrimonious split with MainMan Publishing. Bowie himself later clarified: "Isola is Italian for island. Isolation plus Solar equals Isolar. If I remember correctly, I was stoned."

Set list
This set list is representative of the performance on 7 May 1976 in London, UK, at Empire Pool. It does not represent all concerts for the duration of the tour.

"Station to Station"
"Suffragette City"
"Fame"
"Word on a Wing"
"Stay"
"I'm Waiting for the Man"
"Queen Bitch"
"Life on Mars?
"Five Years"
"Panic in Detroit"
"Changes"
"TVC 15"
"Diamond Dogs"
Encore
"Rebel Rebel"
"The Jean Genie"

Tour dates

Cancellations and rescheduled shows

Songs

From Hunky Dory
 "Changes"
 "Life on Mars?"
 "Queen Bitch"
From The Rise and Fall of Ziggy Stardust and the Spiders from Mars
 "Five Years"
 "Suffragette City"
From Aladdin Sane
 "Panic in Detroit"
 "The Jean Genie"
From Diamond Dogs
 "Diamond Dogs"
 "Rebel Rebel"

From Young Americans
 "Fame" (Bowie, John Lennon, Carlos Alomar)
From Station to Station
 "Station to Station"
 "Golden Years"
 "Word on a Wing"
 "TVC 15"
 "Stay"
Other songs
 "I'm Waiting for the Man" (originally from The Velvet Underground & Nico (1967) by The Velvet Underground and Nico, written by Lou Reed; outtake from various Bowie sessions 1966-72)
 "Sister Midnight" (from The Idiot by Iggy Pop; written by Pop, Bowie and Alomar)

Personnel

Band ("Raw Moon")
David Bowie – Vocals, saxophone
Carlos Alomar – Rhythm guitar, music director, backing vocals
Stacy Heydon – Lead guitar, backing vocals
George Murray – Bass guitar, backing vocals
Dennis Davis – Drums, percussion
Tony Kaye – Keyboards

Crew
Vern Moose Constan, Rob Joyce – Band technicians/personnel
Lonnie McKenzie, Leroy Kerr, Lester Burton, Buddy Prewitt, Larry Sizemore – Lighting technicians/personnel
Buford Jones, Scott Wadsworth – Sound technicians/personnel

References

Sources

David Bowie concert tours
1976 concert tours